The word “siyar” dates originally from the late Ummayyad period when the term had the connotation of “position of the school or sect” or “opinion” on a creedal or political question. This genre was well-known among the Islamic groups who rebelled against the Ummayyads such as the Muhakkimah, Zaydis, Murji’ites and Ibadis.

Most of the siyar convey the viewpoint of the school and consist of homilies, epistles, addressed to the fellowship of the believers. These epistles are read out aloud by the preacher, setting out what ought or ought not to be believed, as well as those deeds that ought or ought not to be done. The exhortations at the beginning of the siyar are relatively long and reflect the social context of their time. The siyar that have so far been reviewed and edited are from what is referred to as the “Basra period”; most of them were written in Iraq, while some of the others were produced during the “regional period” – i.e. “abroad”.

References

Islamic literature
Literary genres